North Texas Soccer Association, established in 1964, organises over 175,000 soccer players registered through over 123 member associations. It was formerly based in Carrollton, Texas, and is now based in Frisco, Texas. The Association is a member of the United States Youth and Amateur Soccer Associations, the United States Soccer Federation and FIFA.

See also
North Texas

References

State Soccer Associations
Sports in Dallas
Non-profit organizations based in Texas
Soccer in Texas
Youth soccer in the United States
Soccer governing bodies in the United States
Sports organizations established in 1964
1964 establishments in Texas
Organizations based in Frisco, Texas